The Melanau–Kajang languages or Central Sarawak languages are a group of languages spoken in Kalimantan, Indonesia and Sarawak, Malaysia by the Kenyah, Melanau and related peoples.

Classification

Smith (2017)
Smith (2017) uses the term Central Sarawak, and puts it as an independent branch within the Greater North Borneo subgroup. He classifies the languages as follows.
Melanau (Dalat, Sarikei, Mukah, Balingian, Matu, Sibu, Kanowit)
Kajang (Kejaman, Sekapan, Lahanan)
Punan–Müller-Schwaner
Punan
Punan Bah, Punan Tubu, Sajau
Punan Lisum, Punan Aput, Beketan, Ukit, Buket
Müller-Schwaner
Hovongan
Kereho, Aoheng, Seputan

Austroasiatic influence
Kaufman (2018) notes that many Proto-Central Sarawak words (Smith 2017) are of likely Austroasiatic origin, including the following (Note: The Austroasiatic branch reconstructions are from Paul Sidwell's reconstructions; Proto-Pearic is from Headley (1985)).
 *siaw ‘chicken’ (cf. Proto-Khasic *sʔiar; Proto-Khmuic *(s)ʔiər)
 *tilaŋ ‘tiger leech’ (cf. Proto-Katuic *ɟləəŋ)
 *(ə)liŋ ‘saliva’

Proto-Kajang words of likely Austroasiatic origin:
 *diə̯k ‘chicken’ (cf. Proto-Pearic *hlɛːk)
 *(u)bəl ‘mute’ (cf. Proto-Bahnaric *kmlɔː)

Proto-Müller-Schwaner words of likely Austroasiatic origin:
 *ənap ‘fish scale’

References

Rensch, Calvin R. 2012. Melanau and the Languages of Central Sarawak. SIL Electronic Survey Report. SIL International.

 
Central Sarawak languages